Paweł Bernas (born 24 May 1990) is a Polish racing cyclist, who most recently rode for Polish amateur team Cryospace Świętokrzyskie Cycling Academy. He rode at the 2014 UCI Road World Championships. In August 2019, he was named in the startlist for the 2019 Vuelta a España.

Major results
Source: 

2011
 1st Overall Carpathian Couriers Race
 10th Memoriał Andrzeja Trochanowskiego
2012
 National Under-23 Road Championships
2nd Road race
2nd Time trial
 6th Tour Bohemia
 8th Overall Okolo Jižních Čech
2013
 3rd Overall Dookoła Mazowsza
1st Stage 4 (TTT)
 Les Challenges de la Marche Verte
5th GP Sakia El Hamra
8th GP Al Massira
9th GP Oued Eddahab
 7th Coupe des Carpathes
2014
 1st GP Slovakia
 1st GP Hungary
 2nd Overall Tour of Małopolska
 4th Overall Tour of China I
1st Stage 1
 5th Overall Course de la Solidarité Olympique
 6th Overall Memorial Grundmanna I Wizowskiego
 7th Overall Okolo Slovenska
2015
 1st  Overall Volta ao Alentejo
1st Stage 4
 1st  Overall Szlakiem Grodów Piastowskich
1st Stage 3
 1st GP Czech Republic
 2nd Overall GP Sudoeste e Costa Vicentina
1st  Points classification
1st Stage 1
 3rd Road race, National Road Championships
2017
 2nd Overall Tour of Małopolska
 2nd Puchar Uzdrowisk Karpackich
 4th Overall Szlakiem Grodów Piastowskich
 4th Szlakiem Wielkich Jezior
 5th Memoriał Romana Siemińskiego
 6th Overall Course de Solidarność et des Champions Olympiques
 6th Overall Bałtyk–Karkonosze Tour
 8th Grand Prix Poland
 8th Memoriał Andrzeja Trochanowskiego
 8th GP Slovakia
 9th Overall Szlakiem Walk Majora Hubala
2018
 2nd Great War Remembrance Race
 6th Grote Prijs Stad Zottegem
 7th Grand Prix Doliny Baryczy Milicz
 9th Overall Szlakiem Grodów Piastowskich
2019
 8th Ronde van Drenthe
2020
 1st Grand Prix Alanya
 1st  Sprints classification, Sibiu Cycling Tour
 1st Stage 4 Giro della Regione Friuli Venezia Giulia
 2nd Grand Prix Velo Alanya
 3rd Overall International Tour of Rhodes
 3rd Overall Dookoła Mazowsza
 7th Overall Course de Solidarność et des Champions Olympiques
2021
 1st  Mountains classification, Alpes Isère Tour
 1st  Sprints classification, Sibiu Cycling Tour
 8th Overall Szlakiem Grodów Piastowskich
 9th Overall International Tour of Rhodes

Grand Tour general classification results timeline

References

External links
 

1990 births
Living people
Polish male cyclists
Sportspeople from Gliwice
European Games competitors for Poland
Cyclists at the 2015 European Games